is a Japanese former freestyle swimmer. He competed in the men's 100 metre freestyle at the 1976 Summer Olympics.

References

External links
 

1956 births
Living people
Olympic swimmers of Japan
Swimmers at the 1976 Summer Olympics
Sportspeople from Hiroshima
Japanese male freestyle swimmers
20th-century Japanese people